Muqaddar is a 2020 Pakistani television series directed by Shehrazade Sheikh. It premiered on Geo Entertainment on 17 February 2020. It is produced by Abdullah Kadwani and Asad Qureshi under their banner 7th Sky Entertainment. It features Faysal Qureshi and Madiha Imam in their third project together. The supporting cast include Ayesha Gul, Ali Ansari, Haroon Shahid, Shameen Khan, Fazila Kaiser and Saif-e-Hassan.

It is digitally available to stream on YouTube and in some countries on VIU App.

Synopsis

Raima (Madiha Imam) is RJ who wants to make a name for herself. At work she gets the opportunity to interview her colleague Saad (Haroon Shahid)'s influential businessman uncle, Saif (Faysal Qureshi). Saif falls in love with her and then using his influence and power forces Raima into marrying him.

Raima receives constant animosity from Saif’s household and no support from her own family. Then follows Raima's challenges to escape the atrocities inflicted by Saif and his family. Who will help her and give support in her struggle?

Cast

Main Characters
Faysal Qureshi as Sardar Saif Ur Rehman (Dead)
Madiha Imam as Raima Saif nee Alvi
Ayesha Gul as Farkhanda Begum
Ali Ansari as Haris Alvi
Haroon Shahid as Saad Ur Rehman

Recurring Characters
Shameen Khan as Maham
Fazila Kaiser as Bilquis, Haris's mother (Dead)
Saif-e-Hassan as Haris's father
Sabeena Farooq as Abeera
Haris Waheed as Hassan Sherazi
Sabeena Syed as Zara
Annie Zaidi as Maimuna
Nabeela Khan as Salma, Zara's mother
Birjees Farooqui as Maham's Mother
Shahzad Mukhtar as Maham's Father

Production 
On 14 November 2019, Qureshi revealed through Instagram about his upcoming project. In December 2019, it was reported that Imam will be paired opposite Qureshi in lead. The first teaser was released on 20 March 2020. It is the third project featuring Qureshi and Imam together after Zakham (2016) and Baba Jani (2018).

Soundtrack

The OST is sung and composed by Sahir Ali Bagga and Sehar Gul on lyrics of Asim Raza.

Awards and nominations

References

External links
 Muqaddar on Official website

2020 Pakistani television series debuts
Pakistani television series
Geo TV original programming
Urdu-language television shows
2020s Pakistani television series